Bame Monrovia is a football club based in Monrovia, Liberia. 

The team was founded in 1934.

Stadium
Currently the team plays at the 10,000 Antonette Tubman Stadium.

Performance in CAF competitions
CAF Champions League: 1 appearance
1975 African Cup of Champions Clubs – First Round

References

External links

Football clubs in Liberia
Sport in Monrovia
1930s establishments in Liberia
Association football clubs established in 1934